Oak Ridge is a historic plantation estate at 2345 Berry Hill Road (United States Route 311) in rural Pittsylvania County, Virginia, west of Danville.  Originally part of a large antebellum estate, it now consists of  overlooking the Dan River.  The estate complex includes a c. 1840 Greek Revival frame residence with a Doric temple front, and a number of outbuildings, including the original kitchen house as well as many dating from the early 20th century.  The house was built for George and Justinia Adams; their daughter Emma married Doctor Robert Wilson whose office was located in one of the outbuildings.
The property was listed on the National Register of Historic Places in 2017.

See also
National Register of Historic Places listings in Pittsylvania County, Virginia

References

Houses on the National Register of Historic Places in Virginia
Federal architecture in Virginia
Houses completed in 1840
Houses in Pittsylvania County, Virginia
National Register of Historic Places in Pittsylvania County, Virginia
Historic districts in Virginia